is one of Nightmare's 10th anniversary albums, released on January 1, 2010. Two different versions were released. One containing only a CD, and the other containing a CD+DVD. The album is a compilation of all the "Gianizm" tracks, including two new Gianizm tracks never before released. All tracks have been re-recorded for the album, excluding Shichi, Hachi, and Kyuu. The DVD included with the limited edition contains a video for each track. The album peaked at #19 in the Oricon chart, selling 18,201 copies in the first week (20,914 total reported sales).

Track listing

References

2010 albums
Nightmare (Japanese band) albums